Vientianea is a monotypic genus of Laotian goblin spiders containing the single species, Vientianea peterjaegeri. It was first described by Y. F. Tong & S. Q. Li in 2013, and is only found in Laos.

See also
 List of Oonopidae species

References

Monotypic Araneomorphae genera
Oonopidae
Spiders of Asia